Muhammad Bayu Pangisthu (born 24 February 1996) is an Indonesian badminton player. He is from PB. Djarum, a badminton club in Kudus, Central Java and has been with the club since 2009.

Career 
In 2012 he participated at the Indonesia Open Grand Prix Gold. In 2013 he participated at the Vietnam Open and at the Indonesia Open Grand Prix Gold; in 2014 at the World junior championships. In 2013 he was a finalist at the Maldives International.

Achievements

BWF International Challenge/Series 

  BWF International Challenge tournament
  BWF International Series tournament

National Circuit 
Men's singles

Record against selected opponents 
Head to head (H2H) against World Superseries finalists, World Championships semifinalists, and Olympic quarterfinalists.

  Xue Song 1–1
  B. Sai Praneeth 1–1
  Sameer Verma 1–0
  Jeon Hyeok-jin 1–0
  Lee Hyun-il 0–2
  Tanongsak Saensomboonsuk 0–2

Performance timeline

Indonesian team 
 Junior level

 Senior level

Individual competitions 
 Senior level

References

External links 
 

1996 births
Living people
Sportspeople from Medan
Indonesian male badminton players
21st-century Indonesian people